Yanis Henin (born 24 June 1999) is a professional footballer who plays as a goalkeeper for Wydad. Born in France, he is a youth international for Morocco.

Club career
Henin is a youth product of FC Montrouge, Clairefontaine and Monaco. He began his senior career with the reserves of Monaco in 2017, playing 2 seasons with them. Released in the summer of 2019, he transferred to the Moroccan club Wydad on 15 January 2020. He made his senior and professional debut with Wydad in a 1–0 CAF Champions League win over Petro de Luanda on 23 February 2021.

International career
Born in France, Henin is of Moroccan and French descent. He is a youth international for Morocco, having played up to the Morocco U23s.

Personal life
Outside of football, Henin pursued a masters in Business and Engineering from the Moroccan university ISGA.

Honours
Wydad
Botola: 2020–21, 2021–22

References

External links
 
 

1999 births
Living people
Footballers from Paris
Moroccan footballers
Morocco youth international footballers
French footballers
Moroccan people of French descent
French sportspeople of Moroccan descent
Association football goalkeepers
AS Monaco FC II players
Wydad AC players
Championnat National 3 players
Botola players